Herbert Benbow (4 October 1861 – 2 February 1941) was an English cricketer. He played two first-class matches for Cambridge University Cricket Club in 1881.

See also
 List of Cambridge University Cricket Club players

References

External links
 

1861 births
1941 deaths
English cricketers
Cambridge University cricketers
People from Hillingdon